Dieng may refer to:

Places 
 Dieng Plateau, a marshy plateau situated near Wonosobo, Indonesia
 Dieng Volcanic Complex, a complex of volcanoes in the Central Java, Indonesia

People 
 Aïyb Dieng, Senegalese drummer
 Adama Dieng (born 1950), UN Secretary-General's Special Adviser for the Prevention of Genocide
 Gorgui Dieng (born 1990), Senegalese basketball player
 Mame Younousse Dieng (1939–2016), Senegalese writer
 Ndiaga Dieng (born 1999), Italian Paralympic athlete
 Ndiouga Dieng, Senegalese singer, Orchestra Baobab
 Ousmane Tanor Dieng (born 1948), first secretary of the Socialist Party of Senegal
 Oumar Dieng (born 1972), French footballer
 Seny Dieng (born 1994), Senegalese footballer